Antoni Pachla (21 March 1901 – 20 April 1962) was a Polish sports shooter. He competed in the 50 m rifle event at the 1936 Summer Olympics.

References

1901 births
1962 deaths
Polish male sport shooters
Olympic shooters of Poland
Shooters at the 1936 Summer Olympics
Sportspeople from Lviv
Home Army members
20th-century Polish people